Perictenus is a genus of wandering spiders containing the single species, Perictenus molecula. It was  first described by A. Henrard & Rudy Jocqué in 2017, and is only found in Guinea.

References

Ctenidae
Monotypic Araneomorphae genera